Astro Boy, known in Japan as , is a fictional superhero and the protagonist of the eponymous franchise. Created by Osamu Tezuka, the character was introduced in the 1951 Captain Atom manga. Astro Boy has appeared in animated television shows (notably the 1963, 1980, 2003 series) and feature film adaptations of its eponymous manga, as well as a live-action TV series, other works by Tezuka, and video games.

On 7 April 2003, the City of Niiza registered the character as an actual resident. He was also inducted into the Robot Hall of Fame in 2004.

Creation and conception
Atom (known as Astro Boy or just Astro in English) originally appeared as a supporting character in the comic Atom Taishi (Ambassador Atom, sometimes referred to as Captain Atom), which appeared in Shonen, a monthly magazine for boys, in April 1951. Tezuka then created a comic series in which Astro was the main character.

Osamu Tezuka created Astro to be, in the words of Frederik L. Schodt (creator of the English-language version of the Astro Boy manga), a "21st-century reverse-Pinocchio, a nearly perfect robot who strove to become more human and emotive and to serve as an interface between man and machine." As Tezuka's art style advanced, Astro "became more modern and 'cute'" to appeal to the audience of boys in elementary school.

Appearances

Original manga and 1960s series
Astro Boy was created by Doctor Tenma (Dr. Boynton in the 1960s English dub), and was meant to be a replacement for his recently deceased son Tobio ("Toby" in various English translations and Astor Boynton in the 1960s English dub). However, because the robotic replica was not able to grow and age like a normal human child, Doctor Tenma sold him to a Robot Circus led by the cruel Ham Egg. At the circus, Tobio was renamed to "Astro" and later found by Professor Ochanomizu (Dr. Elefun) and took away following the law of robot rights. Professor Ochanomizu gave Astro a family with a robotic mother, father, sister (Uran/Astro Girl) and brother (Cobalt/Jetto). As head of the Ministry of Science, Professor Ochanomizu often calls on Astro to help resolve situations involving humans, robots and (on occasion) extraterrestrials.

1980s series 
Astro Boy appeared in the show of the same name as its major protagonist. He was originally built by Doctor Tenma after his original son, Tobio, who was recently killed in a car crash. Built in Tobio’s image, Tenma is nearing the completion of a child robot with jets and weapons that he sees as his son; however, his coworkers are afraid of the danger that such a robot may bring. While the robot is almost finished, the villain Skunk manages to steal copies of its plans and give them to count Walpur Guiss (his boss), who plans to build a robot equipped with the Omega Factor (which gives his robot the ability to lie and other negative qualities) to “rule the world”.

Doctor Tenma raises Astro as if he were his dead son, teaching him to speak and eat (which Astro has the ability to perform). While being alone, Astro learns to fly but accidentally touches electric wires. His destroyed clothes appear to be the only consequences, but not very long afterward the robot has a malfunction and his eyes flashing red. Tenma calls Honda, who tells him the robot might have a short-circuit (although the real reason is the activation of Atlas, Walpur Guiss’s robot).

Honda attempted to destroy the robot with a Robot Disposer, but it went out of control due Dr. Tenma's interference and it went attacking everyone of the city.
The robot Tobio, who had been recovered, saved everyone and destroyed the rampaging Robot Disposer, dumping it into the sea.

Soon, the news that Dr. Tenma's robot gets out, and Tenma, fearing that the secret is out, decides that he and his creation shall go to America.

On the cruise ship, The robot Tobio fails to master his powers, and has caused a lot of damages such as breaking a tap and ripping away his father’s suit. As a result, Tenma forbids him to go to the dinner with him, but changes his mind at the request of a passenger who want to meet his son. However, when it is noted that Tobio is a robot, people all around the dining room are upset. Following another goof up by Tobio, Tenma expels him, refusing to acknowledge him as his son anymore and calls him a robot. While outside, Tobio is approached by a man called Hamegg who comforts him. A cruel, unforgiving ringmaster for a robot circus, he wants to use Tobio for basic backstage work and asks Astro to sign a contract. Astro, not knowing what the contract means, signs the contract and now he is a possession of Hamegg.

Skunk, meanwhile, brings Atlas with him for his next plot, which is to cause icebergs to sink a ship and have Atlas recover the gold transported by the ship. Tobio foils the plan by attacking the icebergs. He meets Atlas and they both realize that they feel they already met each other in the past without knowing how, then fight. Astro is drained out of energy and falls unconscious at Atlas’ feet. About to destroy him, Atlas forgives him remembering of Livian's words who told him to not take advantage of weak people. Hamegg soon finds Tobio and locks him in his trunk. Tenma, now feeling remorse, calls for his robot son, but no-one answers.

Tobio wakes up at the circus surrounded by Hamegg, Kathy, his employee, and Tornado, the robot star of the circus. Tobio is given daily chores and performs a clown act in the show. Misunderstanding the instructions he is given and not yet in control of his amazing power, he commits one mistake after another, drawing Hamegg’s fury. By then, Hamegg is already doubting his decision to bring Tobio to his circus.

Dr. Ochanomizu is in town and watches the circus, where Tobio catches his eye. Suffering from bad maintenance, Tornado misses his circus act and is destroyed. Losing the owner’s confidence, Hamegg is in danger of losing the circus. Confident in Tobio’s abilities, Kathy convinces Hamegg that she can teach him Tornado’s dangerous act, which involves him jumping through two spinning rings filled with electricity, which would save the circus. Tobio trains while the circus moves to another city, leaving Ochanomizu, who has finally recognized him as Dr. Tenma’s missing robot. Ochanomizu finds him right as Tobio is about to perform the trapeze act. Tobio makes it, and then saves the crowd from the elephant robots that have become mad after Hamegg overpowered them.

Ochanomizu attempts to convince Hamegg to let Tobio go with him, but Hamegg will not hear of it. Meanwhile, Kathy plots to make it look like Tobio was destroyed in an explosion. Hamegg is convinced after watching what seems like Tobio’s parts scattered around, and rips up the contract. Kathy then secretly brings Tobio to Dr. Ochanomizu, who is going to bring him back to his native country. Ochanomizu explains that Tobio is an atomic robot, and Kathy decides he needs to bear a special name: “Atom”. And thus, back in Japan, the adventures of Atom begins.

2003 series 

Astro Boy re-appears as the protagonist in the 2003 series; a robot with the ability to think and reason ('Kokoro', or Japanese for 'heart and soul'). Atom was created by Doctor Tenma as a ‘replacement’ for Tobio, his deceased son. Tenma, overcome with grief, decided to make an identical robot copy, which he will raise just like his own. Tenma, however, during the project lost the trust of his fellow scientists, who had thought that he has been overcome with grief and longing for his son and as a result went insane. Tenma, who was indeed displaying signs of insanity at that point, finished his project and named the robot after his son. Unfortunately, things got out of hand as soon as Astro was led into the basement full of broken robots (including Robita) and the robot Tobio (doing the same thing the original Tobio has done) asks for Tenma to fix it. After Tenma refuses, the robot Tobio rebels against him (the same thing the original Tobio has done) and as a result, Tenma shuts him down.

Before long, Tenma well and truly went insane, and burnt down the lab of the Ministry of Science and resigning his position as minister. The robot, though, was found by Tenma successor (Ochanomizu, called Dr. O'Shay in the English dub) who attempted to bring it back to life and succeeded. The robot was renamed Atom, and Ochanomizu brought him up as a child and he eventually became the hero of Metro City.

Ochanomizu then made him as human-like as possible through means of allowing him to go to school, interact with friends and even gave him a robotic sister (Uran, called Zoran in the English dub), which he is very protective of. Ochanomizu also acts like a father to him, and also in the household is the nanny-bot Robita (different from the other one which used to live with Tobio). Despite at time acting and behaving like a normal human boy, when duty calls he often fights and defeats evil robots, humans and on occasion aliens. Strangely, another villain is Dr. Tenma, who is deeply unsure if he wants Atom back or if he wants to kill him, as he is still insane. Following the Robotania episodes, Atom was badly damaged and Dr. Ochanomizu could not repair him, however Dr. Tenma offered a deal: he would restore Atom if Dr. Ochanomizu allowed him to do the work alone.
Atom was repaired, but got all his memories erased, however Uran and Atom's friends went to his rescue and attempted to protect him from Lamp who went on a rampage against Dr. Tenma and Atom upon learning about their hideout.

Atom recovered his memories and defeated Lamp, afterward Dr. Tenma fled and later attacked the science ministry where he revealed Atom his story.

Dr. Tenma told Atom that he had rebelled against him just like the dead Tobio did and wanted him to join his side, but Atom refused.

With this, Dr. Tenma started a time bomb and tried to destroy himself, but Atom tells him that he didn't want his father to die and Dr. Tenma tells him to live with Dr. Ochanomizu since he wasn't suitable for being a father after all that he has done.

Later, the robots earned rights and Dr. Tenma was then found in the prison putting photos of both of his sons.

Afterward, Atom's friends congratulated him for having his dream realized, but he said that there would still another dream to be realized.

This series also had a game counterpart.

Feature film 

The film is set in the futuristic Metro City, a metropolis which floats in the sky above the polluted "Surface". Metro City's population is aided by a multitude of different robots who are dumped on the Surface when broken or disused. Toby, son of Dr. Tenma, learns that his father is going to show President Stone, the militaristic leader of the city, the Peacekeeper, a new guardian robot that he's been working on. Doctor Elefun, one of Tenma's colleagues, introduces Stone to the Blue and Red Cores, two energy spheres mined from a star fragment, that produce energy which can power robots via positive and negative energy, respectively. Stone places the Red Core in the Peacekeeper, causing it to go out of control. The Peacekeeper tries to attack the humans, but Tenma puts a barrier between them. Meanwhile, Toby has been released early from school and rewires Orrin, his family's robot, in order to attend the Ministry of Science's demonstration of the Peacekeeper. Seeking to have a closer look at the Peacekeeper, Toby enters the same room as the robot, only for the Peacekeeper's first attempt to destroy the barrier to backfire with the result that Toby is totally annihilated. After the Peacekeeper is stopped by security forces, Dr. Tenma, wracked with despair, builds an identical robot clone of Toby, using DNA from a strand of his hair to obtain his memories, which will make the robot think he is Toby. He also powers the robot with a positive blue core. The robot quickly comes to life, and Tenma brings him home.

Tenma quickly realizes that while the robot possesses Toby's memories, it is not exactly like his original son, as the robot's higher mental and physical powers frequently remind him. Tenma had initially included the robot's powers in order to prevent his "son" from being destroyed again. Unaware that he is a robot, Toby tries to figure out why he can understand the language of some robot cleaners and discovers he can fly via rocket-boosters hidden in his shoes. He discovers various other abilities and heads home to tell his father, only to find that Tenma and Elefun are discussing deactivating him. Tenma reveals to Toby that he is a robot. President Stone's men detect the Blue Core's energy signature and pursue Toby. Stone calls in the Spirit of Freedom: a massive, heavily armed, flying battleship. Rendered unconscious, Toby falls off the floating city and lands in the junkyard below. He meets several children including Cora, a girl who left Metro City after her parents neglected her, and a robotic dog named Trashcan. Toby meets the Robot Revolution Front: Sparx, Robotsky and Mike the Fridge, who easily identify Toby as a robot and rename him "Astro". Astro goes along with his new name and lives with the children and their fatherly figure, Hamegg, who appears to care for broken robots, but secretly treats robots just as callously as Stone, and also runs the Robot Games: destructive gladiatorial matches in which robots are forced to fight to the death.

Astro and his friends find an offline construction robot named ZOG. Astro secretly revives ZOG, and the kids bring him back and clean him up for the Hamegg games. Later that night, Astro comes across Cora trying to call Metrocity. She reveals to him that she actually has parents and was worried if they even missed her. Astro promises not to tell and tries to tell her his secret but can't. The next day at the Hamegg games, Hamegg betrays Astro, learning of him being a robot, and pits Astro against other robots in the Robot Games. Unable to simply leave, Astro is forced to destroy all the robots. Hamegg releases ZOG for Astro to fight, but both refuse to fight one another. Stone and his men arrive then and arrest Astro. They take him back to the Ministry of Science, where Tenma is asked to remove the Blue Core; however, at the last moment, he has a change of heart, accepting that even if Astro isn't Toby, he's still his son, and allows Astro to escape.  This is the only media in which Tenma accepts his creation back as his son. Stone places the Red Core into the Peacekeeper again, only for it to absorb him and take on his consciousness. Astro and Stone fight across the city, demolishing most of the buildings and causing the city to begin crashing to Earth. Astro is able to slow Metro City's descent by flying underneath and pushing upwards with his leg-rockets. Cora, the other children, and the Robot Revolution try to help to bring down the Peacekeeper/Stone fusion. Stone catches Astro and is about to absorb him, but when the Blue and Red Cores clash, he lets Astro out due to the close proximity of the two Cores causing him great pain.

Astro lands in a building, where he reunites with Tenma. Tenma informs him that if the Blue Core and Red Core come together, Astro and the Peacekeeper will both die. Astro decides that this was the reason he was made, and flies straight toward Stone, crashing into him and merging the Cores which destroys the Peacekeeper and frees Stone (who is knocked out from the collision). However, with both Cores drained of energy, Stone awakes, only to be arrested by his own troops. Astro is deactivated. Cora, Dr. Elefun and others find Astro's body. ZOG transfers some of his Blue Core energy (which Astro kindly gave him) to Astro; with the catalyst restarted, the Blue Core once more becomes a limitless source of energy, so Astro is easily revived and his wounds automatically heal. Astro is reunited with Dr. Tenma, and Cora finds and makes up with her parents. When an alien life-form appears over the city, the movie ends with Astro flying up to battle it.

Astro’s weapons in the movie have been changed or altered when compared to the other series. Astro has machine guns on his backside like in the 1980s series, however this time they fire actual bullets, instead of lasers. His finger lasers “digibeam” is absent. Instead of the arm cannon in the 2003 series, it is changed to full arm blasters in both arms. Also, his arm rockets are absent, although his arm cannons can also serve as a means of propulsion. In the 1980s series, Astro’s eyes act as lights, while in the 2003 series they allow him to analyze things. However, in the film, they are also lights, although they can see through skin or tissue imitating skin, much like an X-ray. Also, Astro retains his super hearing and strength, as well as rockets in his feet.

Another difference is Astro’s source of power. In the original series, he is powered by atoms (hence his Japanese name), but yet in the film he is powered by the Blue Core Energy, made out of pure positive energy. It is unknown as to why the writers changed his power source. Also, this is the first time that Uran does not appear at all.

Other appearances 

As part of the Osamu Tezuka's Star System, Astro has appeared in several of the artist's works (although he is not always identified as "Astro Boy").

List of Astro Boy's appearances 
"Astro Boy" in Captain Atom - 1951
"Astro Boy" in Astro Boy - 1952
"Conference Participant" in The Adventure of Rock - 1952
"Sergeant Ichinotani" in X-Point on the South Pacific - 1953
"Ryoichi" in The Destroyer of the Earth - 1954
"Captain Larry" in My Memory - 1959
"Astro Boy" in Shikuoyamaengi Picture Scroll - 1962
"The Mask" in Robot Labor Union Leader - 1964
"Astro Boy" in Gachaboi's Record of One Generation - 1970
"Astro Boy" in Lion Books: A Hundred Tales - Chapter of Gold - 1971
"The Mask" in Bakaichi - 1971
"The Mask" in Japanese People in 1972 - 1972
"Flying Man Competition Spectator" in Black Jack: Man Bird - 1973
"Isao" in Black Jack: Son of Shiva - 1974
"Black Jack's Client" in Black Jack: You did it! - 1975
"Person in Framed Painting" in Black Jack: Teruteru Bozu - 1976
"Astro Boy" in The Three-eyed One: The Magician - 1976
"Passerby" in Black Jack: Black Jack Saves his Savior - 1978
"Astro Boy" in Osamu Tezuka on American Comics - 1979
"Person in Painting" in Unico: Shogaku-Ichinensei Version - 1980
"Face of Jinnai" in Princess Lumpenela - 1980
"Jimmy" in Rainbow Parakeet: House of Doll - 1981
"The Mask" in Rainbow Parakeet: Forest of Fossil - 1981
"Black Jack" in How the World of Anime will look in the 21st Century - 1982
"Astro Boy" in A word from the parent who bore you - 1982
"Jimmy" in Golden Bat - 1982
"Astro Boy" in Rabbit House 2001 - 1982
"Person in Painting" in This is what's going to happen in 1983 - 1983
"Astro Boy" in Dream cars & cars of the future - 1984
"Astro Boy" in Atom Cat - 1986
"The Mask" in Fuku-chan in 21st Century - 1986
"Adam" in Undersea Super Train: Marine Express - 1979 anime
He also make several cameos in Black Jack TV
 Astro has also made a cameo in two episodes of Kimba the White Lion
 "Monica Teen" Chapter 43 and 44 (Green Treasure arc)

Reception 
Astro was listed on Empire magazine's 50 Greatest Comic Characters list ranking forty third, making Astro the only manga character on the list. IGN's Chris Mackenzie also ranked Astro Boy as 2 on the list of the top anime characters of all time. Astro was placed tenth Mania Entertainment's 10 Most Iconic Anime Heroes written by Thomas Zoth who commented that "he was Japan's first great modern cartoon hero, on the printed page and the TV screen". In 2014, IGN ranked him as the fourth greatest anime character of all time.

Katsuhiro Otomo chose ATOM as the name of the main computer in his manga Fireball as an homage to Tezuka and the character.

See also 

List of Osamu Tezuka anime
List of Osamu Tezuka manga
Osamu Tezuka's Star System

References 

Adoptee characters in anime and manga
Anime and manga characters with superhuman strength
Astro Boy
Child characters in anime and manga
Child superheroes
Comics characters introduced in 1951
Fictional circus performers
Fictional androids
Male characters in anime and manga
Male superheroes
Osamu Tezuka characters
Robot superheroes
Animated characters

ja:鉄腕アトム